USS Tonkawa is a name used more than once by the United States Navy:

  was laid down as ATR-103 on 30 January 1944 at Orange, Texas.
 , a  serving from 1966 to 2000.

United States Navy ship names